The term Group 2 may refer to:
 Alkaline earth metal, a chemical element classification
 Astronaut Group 2, also known as The New Nine, the second group of astronauts selected by NASA in 1962
 Group 2 (racing), an FIA classification for cars in auto racing and Rally racing that preceded Group A
 Group 2, the second level of worldwide Thoroughbred horse races
  Group 2 fax machine - Group 1 & Group 2 are obsolete analog standards for sending faxes
 Group of Two, a proposed informal special relationship between the United States and the People's Republic of China